Nafarroa Bai was a Navarrese coalition in Spain of Basque nationalist and regional left-wing parties created in 2004 for the Spanish General election.

History
The coalition comprised Aralar, the Basque Nationalist Party, Eusko Alkartasuna (Basque Solidarity), Batzarre, and local independents, but not the outlawed Basque nationalists of Batasuna or Accion Nacionalista Vasca (ANV), traditionally the Basque nationalist party in Navarre with strongest support, for its stance on ETA's violence.

All these parties usually ran by themselves competing with each other at elections held in the neighbouring autonomous community of the Basque country but agreed to run together in Navarre. Basque nationalism does not hold a majority there, and the move was aimed at optimizing the Basque nationalist electoral results in Navarre. The coalition came up third and won a seat in the Spanish Parliament in 2004, gaining 18.4% of the votes cast in Navarre.

In 2007 the coalition became the second largest political force in Navarre's autonomous parliament, virtually tied with the Spanish Socialist Workers' Party (PSN–PSOE) by obtaining 23.7% of the votes cast and 12 seats. Five of the seats belonged to Aralar, four to EA and one for each the PNV and Batzarre, another one is independent.
			
Its most significant politicians were Patxi Zabaleta (Aralar), Maiorga Ramírez (Eusko Alkartasuna) and Uxue Barkos, a respected journalist who had worked for the Basque Television. She was the coalition's only MP in the Spanish Parliament.

In the 2008 Spanish General Election, Nafarroa Bai repeated the results of 2004 (18.5%), again coming up third in the autonomous community and repeating its only seat in the Spanish Parliament.

By 2011, new parties and coalitions jumped onto the political scene on the eve of the votation campaign after tribunals in Madrid decided on their legalization. The coalition then broke up when Eusko Alkartasuna and Aralar left it, and the leftovers of the coalition revamped as Geroa Bai, this time participated only by PNV and other minor groups, and led by Uxue Barkos.

Composition

Electoral performance

Parliament of Navarre

Cortes Generales

Navarre

References

External links
 Official website (archive)

 
2004 establishments in Spain
Political parties in Navarre